This is a list of civil parishes in the ceremonial county of Wiltshire, England. There are 275 civil parishes.

Swindon
Since 2017, the Borough of Swindon (formerly Swindon Municipal Borough and the surrounding Highworth Rural District) is fully parished. There are 20 parishes:

Central Swindon South is the official name of the parish but the parish council styles itself as South Swindon.

Wiltshire
The whole of the county is parished.

See also
 List of places in Swindon
 List of places in Wiltshire
 List of settlements in Wiltshire by population

References

Civil parishes
Civil parishes
Wiltshire